Bearded is a British bi-monthly music magazine that covers the independent music industry, reviewing artists who are either unsigned or signed to independent record labels.

History
Bearded was founded by Gareth Main, a former editor of the trade publication Golf Course News International, which aimed to provide nationwide coverage for independent artists.

The first issue of Bearded was released on 14 August 2007 with an illustration of actor and musician Matt Berry on the cover. The cover design was minimal, featuring only the original Bearded logo with no content or other information. This design continued through the first 18 months of the magazine, until Bearded relaunched on 29 January 2009, after which the logo was changed. The magazine retained its signature minimal aesthetic.

Beardaid
On 14 July 2008, Bearded announced the launch of Beardaid, a charitable side to the magazine that aimed to further help people working in the independent music industry. Beardaid then offered independent labels subsidized advertisements in Bearded to help them reach a wider audience previously unreachable due to cost.

Critical reaction
Following the magazine's launch, online Journalism blogger Paul Bradshaw heralded its "web-savvy business model" while Created in Birmingham's Pete Ashton commented on Bearded's "very impressive start."

Distribution 
Bearded is distributed in the UK through independent record shops, and newsagents including WHSmith and previously Borders.

References

External links
 

2007 establishments in the United Kingdom
Magazines established in 2007
Bi-monthly magazines published in the United Kingdom
Music magazines published in the United Kingdom
Mass media in Birmingham, West Midlands